The Scorpion or Al-'Aqrab is a collection of stories  by Yemeni writer Zayd Mutee' Dammaj. It was first published in 1982.

References

Books by Zayd Mutee' Dammaj
1982 novels